Undisputed is a DJ mix album compiled and produced by Deep Dish.

Track listing
Agua Negra - Love Evolution – 5:31 
Deep Dish presents Dc Deepressed – Comeback - 6:46 
TNT - Feel It – 4:30 
Bb Boogie Association - Fire – 6:15 
ROC & Kato - Alright – 7:45 
Agua Negra - More – 7:06 
Basic Soul - Hi Line – 6:32 
Grand Centra – Real good - 2:56 
95 North  – Shake What You Got – 3:08 
95 North - Let Me In – 5:20 
Kill all Infidels (Deep Dish Mix) – 12:20 
Loosse featuring Yolanda Reynolds - About YOU – 1:47
Firefly featuring Ursula Rucker – Supernatural – 6:00

1995 compilation albums
DJ mix albums
Deep Dish (band) compilation albums